Dudahi  is a Nagar Panchayat (Town Area) in the Kushinagar district of Uttar Pradesh, a state in northern India. Dudahi is situated on the Thawe–Kaptanganj railway route near Padrauna.

In Dudahi, there are some main government institutes i.e. Adarsh Anglo Intermediate College, Sanskrit Pathshala, Purv Madhyamik Vidyalay Dudahi (Middle School) and Primary School Dudahi. 

Dudahi is located at the border of Uttar Pradesh and Bihar.
In Dudahi name of some famous markets are Station Bazar, Gola Bazar, Suraji Bazar and Station road bazar. Gola Bazar and durga mandir bazar is famous for Kirana/Clothes Shops and Rice for Suraji Bazar is famous for Huge Area . It has 7 Nyaya Panchayat , 58 Village Councils, 
91 Villages.

In Dudahi nationalised banks are situated. These banks are PUNJAB NATIONAL BANK, STATE BANK OF INDIA, HDFC BANK, PURVANCHAL GRAMIN BANK and District Co-operative bank. There are many ATMs for cash withdrawal working 24*7.

In Dudahi there are some other public serving bodies like Railway Station, Samudayik Swasthya Kendra (CHC), Block Office and Police Station in Vishunpura.

In Dudahi there are various holy places Like 'Ram Janaki Mandir, Suraji Bazar  Shiv Parvati Mandir near High School, durga mandir  Temple in Near Adarsh 
One famous temple Sheetla Mata Mandir built in just 84 days in jeerat. This temple has two storey building and perfect architecture. The temple committee is very active and doing tremendous work .

Two hospitals are Mahanth ShivaNand Hospital and Atharva Hospital with all facilities

References

Cities and towns in Kushinagar district